Şehzade Ertuğrul Osman Efendi, also known as Osman Ertuğrul Osmanoğlu with a surname as required by the Turkish Republic (18 August 1912 – 23 September 2009), was a Prince of the Ottoman Empire and the 43rd Head of the Imperial House of Osman from 1994 until his death.

Until the abolition of the monarchy on 1 November 1922, Osman was addressed as His Imperial Highness Şehzade Ertuğrul Osman Efendi Hazretleri, Imperial Prince of the Ottoman Empire. He is known in Turkey as "the Last Ottoman".

Biography
Şehzade Ertuğrul Osman was born on 18 August 1912 in Istanbul, in Nişantaşı Palace. He was the second, and youngest son of Şehzade Mehmed Burhaneddin (Yıldız Palace, 19 December 1885 – New York City, United States, 15 June 1949, and buried in Damascus). His father served as a Captain of the Ottoman Army. Ertuğrul Osman's mother was Burhaneddin's second consort, Aliye Melek Nazlıyar Hanım (Adapazarı, 13 October 1892 – Ankara, 31 August 1976), daughter of Huseyin Bey. They married at Nişantaşı, Nişantaşı Palace, Pera (today Beyoğlu) on 7 June 1909 and divorced in 1919. Osman's paternal grandparents were Sultan Abdul Hamid II and Mezidemestan Kadın.

In 1924, while studying in Vienna, Austria, he received news that all members of the Sultan's family were to be exiled. He lived in the United States from 1933 and later resided in New York City. He was educated in mining engineering. He worked as consultant for a Canadian company Wells Overseas which often sent him to South America.

Osman lived modestly in Manhattan after 1945, residing in a two-bedroom apartment above a restaurant. He returned to Turkey in 1992, having been invited by the country's government. At that time, he observed, "Democracy works well in Turkey." He became the 43rd Head of the Imperial House of Osman in 1994.

Osman was granted a Turkish passport and citizenship in 2004.

Osman spoke Turkish, English, German and French fluently and understood Italian and Spanish.

He died aged 97 on 23 September 2009. The Turkish Ministry of Culture announced that Ertuğrul had died in his sleep as a result of kidney failure. His wife, who was by his side, when he died, also confirmed the cause of death. The Prince had spent one week in Istanbul's Memorial hospital at the time of his death. Osman's funeral was held at the Sultan Ahmed Mosque in Istanbul on 26 September. His body was interred next to his grandfather Sultan Abdul Hamid II in Istanbul's Çemberlitaş neighborhood. His coffin was draped with the Imperial Ottoman Standard and his funeral was attended by Turkish Government Ministers. The Prime Minister of the Republic of Turkey and the President of the Republic of Turkey both sent condolences to the Imperial family. The Prime Minister also later visited Osman's widow at a former Imperial Palace to express his condolences.

Marriages
He was married twice, first in New York City, New York, on 20 January 1947 to Gulda Twerskoy (Johannesburg, South Africa, 20 March 1915 – New York City, 16 September 1985), without issue. His second wife, whom he married on a football pitch, on 27 September 1991, also without issue, Zeynep Tarzi (born Istanbul, 16 December 1940), is the daughter of Abdulfettah Tarzi, nephew-in-law of the former King of Afghanistan, Amanullah Khan, and of Pakize Tarzi, a pioneering Turkish gynaecologist from a deep-rooted Ottoman family. He was married to Zeynep until his death at 97 years of age.

Ancestry

References

External links

Ottoman Club
 Ertugrul Osman – Daily Telegraph obituary

1912 births
2009 deaths
Sciences Po alumni
Royalty from Istanbul
People from Manhattan
Turkish expatriates in the United States
Deaths from kidney failure
Heads of the Osmanoğlu family